Moscow Technological Institute (formerly known as World Technological University UNESCO) was established in 1997 for the amalgamation of the international, national and regional efforts for the further development and perfection of the persistent technological education. It is the only institute of higher education that works under the aegis of UNESCO to execute the decree of the Russian Federation Government from 6 January 1997, 13. This project of UNESCO has been aimed at the internationalisation training of personnel in the sphere of high technology all over the world. The aim of MTI is to provide the integration of the best universities efforts for the spread of knowledge, high technologies and besides ensuring the moderateness of education.

2 faculties and 13 departments do the work towards 64-direction training of personnel in MTI structure. MTI collaborates with 82 Russian universities, among them Moscow State Technical University n.a. N.E. Bauman (MSTU), Plekhanov Russian Academy of Economics and others. The education works not only in Russia, but abroad. The links are established between the universities of Italy, France, Switzerland, the United States and Malaysia.

Oct 25, 2018 Moscow Technological Institute reformed and merged as a division of the Moscow Open Institute

Study structure

Undergraduate 

Higher education towards such training directions as: "Management ", "Economy ", " Informatics ", "Construction ", " Thermal and Heating technology ", "Management of technical systems ", "Electric Power and Electrical Engineering" " Technosphere Safety ". There are different study options available for students including full-time, part-time, weekend, part-time with a distance learning technologies options.

BBA (Bachelor of Business Administration) 

Education training program BBA (Bachelor of Business Administration) is a part of the educational profile of "Small Business Management ", Management specialisation. The main difference of BBA program consists in an in-depth study of issues related to particular management functions ( strategic management, marketing management, human resource management, production management, process management and project management, sales management) and  different fields of entrepreneurial activity (construction business, restaurant business, advertising business and internet marketing business, hotel and tourism business ). Due to its functional and branch specialisation, BBA is simultaneously a traditional undergraduate program and a preliminary step to getting an MBA (Master of Business Administration). Upon the completing their studies, graduates receive a state diploma of higher education with the degree of Bachelor of Management with the specialisation in a chosen fields of study, an international diploma with a  Bachelor of Business Administration  degree, and a European Diploma Supplement as well.

Second degree 

Undergraduate and master's degree program studies. Undergraduate studies imply a fundamental  learning of a discipline most basic concepts, but also provides  an option of a reduced program duration (3,5 years) . Master's degree ( 2-2.5 years ) is based on a deeper and more detailed study of a particular specialisation.

Master’s degree 

Different specialisations such as "Management", "Economy", "Computer Science", "Power and Electrical Engineering", etc.

College 

The training of specialists on a secondary vocational education programs: "Economics and Management", "Computer Science". Upon the completing of the training, participants receive a state diploma.

MBA programs 

Different programs such as MBA Start, MBA Professional, MBA Industry, Mini-MBA MBA program provide students with theoretical and practical knowledge necessary for the effective professional activity in a chosen specialty. The training program includes courses in disciplines such as economics, financial reporting, law, human resources management, marketing, production management, etc. Students get an up-to-date information in the key aspects of business, take part in practical internships which allow them to develop leadership skills. All the MBA programs within the MTI have RABE accreditation (Russian association of business education). Upon the graduation one will be granted a diploma that confirms the specific qualification.

Continuing Professional Development 

Additional education:
 Business administration
 Computer and Information Sciences

During the training the participants take part in web-conferences, attend professor's’ and tutors’ consultations, use the studying materials and additional literature of the digital library. Upon the graduation the participants get the diploma of advanced training that certifies the right to conduct activities in the selected sphere.

Development of competence 

is the additional education for specialists and directors that allow to improve their professional knowledge and skills.

Programmes:
 “Construction”
 “Technical security”
 “Energy efficiency”.
The goal of these programs is acquiring extra practical knowledge and skills and also exploring new ways and methods of work.

Faculties and Departments

Faculty of modern technology and technics 

The faculty is one of the largest centres in Russia for training staff in informatics, modern technology and technics spheres. The faculty has a strong cooperation with the leading technology companies like Cisco, EMC, Autodesk, Microsoft, Adobe, Oracle, VMWARE, Positive Technologies and others.
Departments:
 Department of Information Science and Automation
 Department of technospheric safety
 Department of energetics
 Department of construction
 Department of science
 Department of food technology

Faculty of Economics and Management 

The faculty provides a wide range of programs within the spheres of “Economics” and “Management”. Both on-site and distance trainings are available.
 Department of economics
 Department of management
 Department of social and humanitarian studies.

Moscow School of Brain and Cognitive Science 

The faculty provides a professional training for psychologists, teachers, coaches, social workers, doctors, businessmen and people interested in personal growth and development.

Moscow Business School 

Moscow Business School is the largest modern centre of business education in Russia, implementing professional trainings for specialists and managers of successful Russian and Western companies.

Partners 

 Institute of Information Technologies (Moscow)
 Institute of Psychoanalysis (Moscow)
 Moscow Business School
 Moscow Institute of Economy, Management and Law (Moscow)
 National Institute of Modern Design (Moscow)
 Samara institute of continuous education (Samara)
 Numbuster

References
 Official Site

Moscow Technological Institute
Technical universities and colleges in Russia